Forevermore is an American metalcore band from Indianapolis, Indiana, formed in 2009. They are signed to Solid State Records and Telos is their first work on the label.

Members
Current
 Kramer Lowe – vocals (ex-Onward to Olympas, ex-Caught in Line of Fire) (2014 - present)
 Jared Storm – guitar (ex-The Onset) (2009–present)
 Alex Smith – guitar (ex-The Onset) (2009–present)
 Michael Taylor – bass (ex-Wings of a Martyr)
 Sammy Vaughn – drums (2009–present)

Former
 Jordan Furr – vocals (2009 - 2013)
 Derek Belser – bass

Discography
Studio albums

EPs
 In the End (2010, Independent)

References

Metalcore musical groups from Indiana
Musical groups from Indianapolis
2009 establishments in Indiana
Musical groups established in 2009
Solid State Records artists
Musical quintets